Thomas Augustin Sullivan (October 18, 1895 – September 23, 1962) was a Major League Baseball pitcher who played for the Philadelphia Phillies in .

External links

1895 births
1962 deaths
Baseball players from Massachusetts
Major League Baseball pitchers
Philadelphia Phillies players